"I Need Love" is the second single from LL Cool J's second album, Bigger and Deffer. The single reached number 1 on the Hot Black Singles and number 14 on the Billboard Hot 100 while becoming one of the first rap songs to enjoy mainstream popularity in the UK, rising to number 8 in the UK Singles Chart. The single won a Soul Train Music Award for Best Rap Single in 1988 Soul Train Music Awards. The song was listed as number 13 on About.com's Top 100 Rap Songs.

Track listing
A-side
"I Need Love" – 5:23

B-side
"I Need Love" (edit) – 4:15 
"My Rhyme Ain't Done" – 3:45

Charts

Weekly charts

Year-end charts

Covers and samples
The music, both melody and beats, were lifted from an instrumental by Brooklyn songwriter Jayson Dyall entitled "Zoraida's Heartbeat" which was written and recorded in 1984. This song, along with other songs on a cassette tape of several raw recordings by Jayson Dyall, was presented to LL Cool J by an associate, who met Dyall through a music classifieds ad in early 1986 and told him he could get LL to listen to his music. Dyall never received any acknowledgment from LL Cool J or Def Jam Records for originally writing the music for this song.

Irish singer-songwriter Luka Bloom recorded a cover version of the song on his 1992 album The Acoustic Motorbike.
R&B group Blaque sampled the song on their track "Don't Go Looking for Love", which originally appeared on their 1999 self-titled debut album.
Rapper Necro used the beat on his song "I Need Drugs", which was released on his 2000 album, I Need Drugs.
Master P sampled this song on his single "I Need Dubs", featuring son Romeo, on his 2005 album Ghetto Bill.
Amanda Blank sampled the song on "A Love Song" from her 2009 album I Love You.
Krizz Kaliko copied lyrics of the song for the first few lines of his song "Anxiety", on his debut album Vitiligo by saying, "When I'm alone in my room, sometimes I stare at the wall/And in the back of my mind, I hear my conscious call/Telling me I need a gun."
Yo Gotti sampled the song on his single "Let's Vibe" featuring Pleasure P.
Rick Ross interpolated the lyrics on the single "Aston Martin Music" featuring Drake and Chrisette Michele from his 2010 album Teflon Don.

References

1987 singles
LL Cool J songs
Contemporary R&B ballads
Songs written by LL Cool J
Song recordings produced by the L.A. Posse